The 2019 Women's African Volleyball Clubs Championship was the 30th edition of the tournament organized by the African Volleyball Confederation (CAVB). It took place between 16 and 25 of March and was held in Cairo, Egypt.

Al Ahly SC started the competition as defending champions and reached the finals, CF de Carthage where they won 3–1 Against CF de Carthage. It was the tenth time Al Ahly won the Women's African Volleyball Clubs Championship title.

Teams
The following 17 teams competed in the tournament:

  Al Ahly SC
  Nigeria Customs
  Canon Yaoundé
  US des Forces Armées
  CF de Carthage
  Alexandria Sporting Club
  KCB
  DGSP
  Kenya Pipeline
  FAP
  Revenue
  Egyptian Shooting Club
  Groupement Sportif des Pétroliers
  El Shams SC
  Kenya Prisons
  ASEC Mimosas
  Nkumba

Group stage
Group winners and runners-up advance to the quarterfinals, groups thirds and fourths advance to the 8th–16th quarterfinals and groups fifth placed teams advance to the 17th–19th play-offs.

Pool A

|}

|}

Final

|}

External links
 Results at kooora.com

Women's volleyball in Egypt
International volleyball competitions hosted by Egypt
Sports competitions in Cairo
African Volleyball Championships
Africa